Harold Jones-Quartey (born August 6, 1993) is a former American football safety. He played college football at the University of Findlay and signed with the Arizona Cardinals as an undrafted free agent in 2015.

College career
Jones-Quartey attended and played college football for the Findlay Oilers. In 2011, he contributed as a wide receiver and had eight receptions for 120 yards and a touchdown.  In 2012, he contributed on offense as a wide receiver and defense as a safety. he had 15 catches for 174 yards and recorded 40 tackles, one interception, which was returned 42 yards for a touchdown. In 2013, he had 92 tackles, three interceptions, nine pass deflections, and one forced fumble.

Professional career

Arizona Cardinals
On May 11, 2015, Jones-Quartey signed with the Arizona Cardinals as an undrafted free agent following the conclusion of the 2015 NFL Draft. Jones-Quartey caught the attention of the Cardinals with his preseason performance against the Kansas City Chiefs. He made six tackles in that game and later, against the San Diego Chargers, intercepted backup quarterback Brad Sorensen. Despite a strong preseason, he was waived by the Cardinals on September 5, 2015.

Chicago Bears
On September 6, 2015, Jones-Quartey was claimed off waivers by the Chicago Bears. He recorded his first NFL career interception and forced fumble against the Tampa Bay Buccaneers on December 27, 2015. As a rookie, Jones-Quartey shined while making the third start of his career. His efforts helped the Bears win in their 26–21 victory over the Buccaneers. He posted four tackles, one interception, one forced fumble, and two passes defended. The interception was the lone red zone turnover by the Bears in 2015. Jones-Quartey then received a nomination for the Pepsi Rookie of the Week honors for Week 16.

On September 2, 2017, Jones-Quartey was waived by the Bears.

New York Jets
On October 18, 2017, Jones-Quartey was signed to the New York Jets' practice squad. He was released on October 24, 2017.

Philadelphia Eagles
On November 14, 2017, Jones-Quartey was signed to the Philadelphia Eagles' practice squad. He was released on December 9, 2017. He was re-signed on January 9, 2018. With Jones-Quartey being on practice squad, the Eagles defeated the New England Patriots in Super Bowl LII.

Kansas City Chiefs
Jones-Quartey signed with the Kansas City Chiefs on March 7, 2019. He was released on August 31, 2019.

St. Louis BattleHawks
Jones-Quartey was selected by the St. Louis BattleHawks in the 2020 XFL Supplemental Draft on November 22, 2019. He had his contract terminated when the league suspended operations on April 10, 2020.

Personal life
Harold is the son of Emmanuel Jones-Quartey and Rosemond Odamitten, and he has four siblings.

References

External links
Kansas City Chiefs bio
Arizona Cardinals bio
Chicago Bears bio
Findlay Oilers bio

1993 births
Living people
American football safeties
Arizona Cardinals players
Chicago Bears players
Findlay Oilers football players
Kansas City Chiefs players
New York Jets players
Philadelphia Eagles players
Players of American football from Columbus, Ohio
St. Louis BattleHawks players